Meschiidae is a family of true bugs in the order Hemiptera. There are at least three genera and about five described species in Meschiidae.

Genera
These two genera belong to the family Meschiidae:
 Heissothignus Slater & Brailovsky, 2006
 Meschia Distant, 1910
 Neomeschia Malipatil, 2014

References

Further reading

 
 
 

Lygaeoidea
Heteroptera families